Cerconota brachyplaca is a moth of the family Depressariidae. It is found in Brazil and French Guiana.

References

Moths described in 1926
Cerconota
Taxa named by Edward Meyrick